Sir Walter Raleigh (– 29 October 1618) was an English statesman, soldier, writer and explorer. One of the most notable figures of the Elizabethan era, he played a leading part in English colonisation of North America, suppressed rebellion in Ireland, helped defend England against the Spanish Armada and held political positions under Elizabeth I.

Raleigh was born to a landed gentry family of Protestant faith in Devon, the son of Walter Raleigh and Catherine Champernowne. He was the younger half-brother of Sir Humphrey Gilbert and a cousin of Sir Richard Grenville. Little is known of his early life, though in his late teens he spent some time in France taking part in the religious civil wars. In his 20s he took part in the suppression of rebellion in the colonisation of Ireland; he also participated in the siege of Smerwick. Later, he became a landlord of property in Ireland and mayor of Youghal in East Munster, where his house still stands in Myrtle Grove. He rose rapidly in the favour of Queen Elizabeth I and was knighted in 1585. He was granted a royal patent to explore Virginia, paving the way for future English settlements. In 1591, he secretly married Elizabeth Throckmorton, one of the Queen's ladies-in-waiting, without the Queen's permission, for which he and his wife were sent to the Tower of London. After his release, they retired to his estate at Sherborne, Dorset.

In 1594, Raleigh heard of a "City of Gold" in South America and sailed to find it, publishing an exaggerated account of his experiences in a book that contributed to the legend of "El Dorado". After Queen Elizabeth died in 1603, Raleigh was again imprisoned in the Tower, this time for being involved in the Main Plot against King James I, who was not favourably disposed towards him. In 1616, he was released to lead a second expedition in search of El Dorado. During the expedition, men led by his top commander ransacked a Spanish outpost, in violation of both the terms of his pardon and the 1604 peace treaty with Spain. Raleigh returned to England and, to appease the Spanish, he was arrested and executed in 1618.

Early life

Little is known about Sir Walter Raleigh's birth but he is believed to have been born on 22 January 1552 (or possibly 1554). He grew up in the house of Hayes Barton (in the parish of East Budleigh), in East Devon. He was the youngest of the five sons of Walter Raleigh (1510–1581) (or Rawleigh) of Fardel Manor (in the parish of Cornwood), in South Devon. Raleigh's family is generally assumed to have been a junior branch of the Raleigh family, 11th-century lords of the manor of Raleigh, Pilton in North Devon, although the two branches are known to have borne entirely dissimilar coats of arms, adopted at the start of the age of heraldry (c. 1200–1215).

His mother was Katherine Champernowne, the third wife of Walter Raleigh senior, and the fourth daughter of Sir Philip Champernowne (1479–1545), lord of the manor of Modbury, Devon, by his wife Catherine Carew, a daughter of Sir Edmund Carew (d.1513) of Mohuns Ottery (in the parish of Luppitt), Devon, and widow of Otes Gilbert (1513–1546/7) of Greenway (in the parish of Brixham) and of Compton Castle (in the parish of Marldon), both in Devon. (The coat of arms of Otes Gilbert and Katherine Champernowne survives in a stained glass window in Churston Ferrers Church, near Greenway.) Katherine Champernowne's paternal aunt was Kat Ashley, governess of Queen Elizabeth I, who introduced Raleigh and his brothers to the court. In addition, Raleigh's maternal uncle was Sir Arthur Champernowne (c. 1524–1578), a Member of Parliament, Sheriff of Devon and Admiral of the West. Walter Raleigh junior's immediate family included his full brother Carew Raleigh, and half-brothers John Gilbert, Humphrey Gilbert and Adrian Gilbert. As a consequence of their kinship with the Champernowne family, all of the Raleigh and Gilbert brothers became prominent during the reigns of Elizabeth I and James I.

Raleigh's family was highly Protestant in religious orientation and had a number of near escapes during the reign of Roman Catholic Queen Mary I of England. In the most notable of these, his father had to hide in a tower to avoid execution. As a result, Raleigh developed a hatred of Roman Catholicism during his childhood, and proved himself quick to express it after Protestant Queen Elizabeth I came to the throne in 1558. In matters of religion, Elizabeth was more moderate than her half-sister Mary.

In 1569, Raleigh left for France to serve with the Huguenots in the French religious civil wars. In 1572, Raleigh was registered as an undergraduate at Oriel College, Oxford, but he left a year later without a degree. He was renowned for the witticisms he would add to open meeting minutes. Raleigh proceeded to finish his education in the Inns of Court. In 1575, he was admitted to the Middle Temple, having previously been a member of Lyon's Inn, one of the Inns of Chancery. At his trial in 1603, he stated that he had never studied law. His life is uncertain between 1569 and 1575, but in his History of the World he claimed to have been an eyewitness at the Battle of Moncontour (3 October 1569) in France. In 1575 or 1576, Raleigh returned to England.

Ireland

See Plantations of Ireland

Between 1579 and 1583, Raleigh took part in the suppression of the Desmond Rebellions. He was present at the siege of Smerwick, where he led the party that beheaded some 600 Spanish and Italian soldiers. Raleigh received  (approximately 0.2% of Ireland) upon the seizure and distribution of land following the attainders arising from the rebellion, including the coastal walled town of Youghal and, further up the Blackwater River, the village of Lismore. This made him one of the principal landowners and colonists in Munster, but he had limited success inducing English tenants to settle on his estates.

Raleigh made the town of Youghal his occasional home during his 17 years as an Irish landlord, frequently being domiciled at Killua Castle, Clonmellon, County Westmeath. He was mayor there from 1588 to 1589. His town mansion of Myrtle Grove is assumed to be the setting for the story that his servant doused him with a bucket of water after seeing clouds of smoke coming from Raleigh's pipe, in the belief that he had been set alight. But this story is also told of other places associated with Raleigh: the Virginia Ash Inn in Henstridge near Sherborne, Sherborne Castle, and South Wraxall Manor in Wiltshire, home of Raleigh's friend Sir Walter Long.

Amongst Raleigh's acquaintances in Munster was another Englishman who had been granted land in the Irish colonies, poet Edmund Spenser. In the 1590s, he and Raleigh travelled together from Ireland to the court at London, where Spenser presented part of his allegorical poem The Faerie Queene to Elizabeth I.

Raleigh's management of his Irish estates ran into difficulties which contributed to a decline in his fortunes. In 1602, he sold the lands to Richard Boyle, 1st Earl of Cork, who subsequently prospered under kings James I and Charles I. Following Raleigh's death, members of his family approached Boyle for compensation on the ground that Raleigh had struck an improvident bargain.

New World

In 1584, Queen Elizabeth granted Raleigh a royal charter authorising him to explore, colonise and rule any "remote, heathen and barbarous lands, countries and territories, not actually possessed of any Christian Prince or inhabited by Christian People", in return for one-fifth of all the gold and silver that might be mined there. This charter specified that Raleigh had seven years in which to establish a settlement, or else lose his right to do so. Raleigh and Elizabeth intended that the venture should provide riches from the New World and a base from which to send privateers on raids against the treasure fleets of Spain. Raleigh himself never visited North America, although he led expeditions in 1595 and 1617 to the Orinoco river basin in South America in search of the golden city of El Dorado. Instead, he sent others in 1585 to find the Roanoke Colony, later known as the "Lost Colony".

These expeditions were funded primarily by Raleigh and his friends but never provided the steady stream of revenue necessary to maintain a colony in America. (Subsequent colonisation attempts in the early 17th century were made under the joint-stock Virginia Company, which was able to raise the capital necessary to create successful colonies.)

In 1587, Raleigh attempted a second expedition, again establishing a settlement on Roanoke Island. This time, a more diverse group of settlers was sent, including some entire families, under the governance of John White. After a short while in America, White returned to England to obtain more supplies for the colony, planning to return in a year. Unfortunately for the colonists at Roanoke, one year became three. The first delay came when Queen Elizabeth I ordered all vessels to remain at port for potential use against the Spanish Armada. After England's 1588 victory over the Spanish Armada, the ships were given permission to sail.

The second delay came after White's small fleet set sail for Roanoke and his crew insisted on sailing first towards Cuba in hopes of capturing treasure-laden Spanish merchant ships. Enormous riches described by their pilot, an experienced Portuguese navigator hired by Raleigh, outweighed White's objections to the delay.

When the supply ship arrived in Roanoke, three years later than planned, the colonists had disappeared. The only clue to their fate was the word "CROATOAN" and the letters "CRO" carved into tree trunks. White had arranged with the settlers that if they should move, the name of their destination be carved into a tree or corner post. This suggested the possibility that they had moved to Croatoan Island, but a hurricane prevented John White from investigating the island for survivors. Other speculation includes their having starved, or been swept away or lost at sea during the stormy weather of 1588. No further attempts at contact were recorded for some years. Whatever the fate of the settlers, the settlement is now remembered as the "Lost Colony of Roanoke Island".

1580s
In December 1581, Raleigh returned to England from Ireland  as his company had been disbanded. He took part in court life and became a favourite of Queen Elizabeth I because of his efforts at increasing the Protestant Church in Ireland. In 1585, Raleigh was knighted and was appointed warden of the stannaries, that is of the tin mines of Cornwall and Devon, Lord Lieutenant of Cornwall and vice-admiral of the two counties. He was a member of parliament for Devonshire in 1585 and 1586. He was also granted the right to colonise America.

Raleigh commissioned shipbuilder R. Chapman of Deptford to build a ship for him. She was originally called Ark but became Ark Raleigh, following the convention at the time by which the ship bore the name of her owner. The Crown (in the person of Queen Elizabeth I) purchased the ship from Raleigh in January 1587 for £5,000 (£ million in 2015). This took the form of a reduction in the sum that Sir Walter owed the queen; he received Exchequer tallies but no money. As a result, the ship was renamed Ark Royal.

In the Armada year of 1588, Raleigh had some involvement with defence against the Spanish at Devon. The ship that he had built, Ark Royal, was Lord High Admiral Howard's flagship.

1590–1594

In 1592, Raleigh was given many rewards by the Queen, including Durham House in the Strand and the estate of Sherborne, Dorset. He was appointed Captain of the Yeomen of the Guard. However, he had not been given any of the great offices of state.

In 1591, Raleigh secretly married Elizabeth "Bess" Throckmorton (or Throgmorton). She was one of the Queen's ladies-in-waiting, 11 years his junior, and was pregnant at the time. She gave birth to a son, believed to be named Damerei, who was given to a wet nurse at Durham House, but he died in October 1592 of plague. Bess resumed her duties to the queen. The following year, the unauthorised marriage was discovered and the Queen ordered Raleigh to be imprisoned and Bess dismissed from court. Both were imprisoned in the Tower of London in June 1592. He was released from prison in August 1592 to manage a recently returned expedition and attack on the Spanish coast. The fleet was recalled by the Queen, but not before it captured an incredibly rich prize—a merchant ship (carrack) named Madre de Deus (Mother of God) off Flores. Raleigh was sent to organise and divide the spoils of the ship. He was sent back to the Tower, but by early 1593 had been released and become a member of Parliament.

It was several years before Raleigh returned to favour, and he travelled extensively in this time. Raleigh and his wife remained devoted to each other. They had two more sons, Walter (known as Wat) in 1593 and Carew in 1605.

Raleigh was elected a burgess of Mitchell, Cornwall, in the parliament of 1593. He retired to his estate at Sherborne, where he built a new house, completed in 1594, known then as Sherborne Lodge. Since extended, it is now known as Sherborne New Castle. He made friends with the local gentry, such as Sir Ralph Horsey of Clifton Maybank and Charles Thynne of Longleat. During this period at a dinner party at Horsey's, Raleigh had a heated discussion about religion with Reverend Ralph Ironsides. The argument later gave rise to charges of atheism against Raleigh, though the charges were dismissed. He was elected to Parliament, speaking on religious and naval matters.

First voyage to Guiana

In 1594, he came into possession of a Spanish account of a great golden city at the headwaters of the Caroní River. A year later, he explored what is now Guyana and eastern Venezuela in search of Lake Parime and Manoa, the legendary city. Once back in England, he published The Discovery of Guiana (1596), an account of his voyage which made exaggerated claims as to what had been discovered. The book can be seen as a contribution to the El Dorado legend. Venezuela has gold deposits, but no evidence indicates that Raleigh found any mines. He is sometimes said to have discovered Angel Falls, but these claims are considered far-fetched.

1596–1603

In 1596, Raleigh took part in the capture of Cádiz, where he was wounded. He also served as the rear admiral (a principal command) of the Islands Voyage to the Azores in 1597. On his return from the Azores, Raleigh helped England defend itself against the major threat of the 3rd Spanish Armada during the autumn of 1597. The Armada was dispersed in the Channel and later was devastated by a storm off Ireland. Lord Howard of Effingham and Raleigh were able to organise a fleet that resulted in the capture of a Spanish ship in retreat carrying vital information regarding the Spanish plans.

In 1597 Raleigh was chosen as member of parliament for Dorset and in 1601 for Cornwall. He was unique in the Elizabethan period in sitting for three counties.

From 1600 to 1603, as governor of the Channel Island of Jersey, Raleigh modernised its defences. This included the construction of a new fort protecting the approaches to Saint Helier, Fort Isabella Bellissima, or Elizabeth Castle.

Trial and imprisonment

Royal favour with Queen Elizabeth had been restored by this time, but his good fortune did not last; the Queen died on 24 March 1603. Raleigh was arrested on 19 July 1603 at what is now the Old Exeter Inn in Ashburton, charged with treason for his involvement in the Main Plot against Elizabeth's successor, James I, and imprisoned in the Tower of London.

Raleigh's trial began on 17 November in the converted Great Hall of Winchester Castle. Raleigh conducted his own defence. The chief evidence against him was the signed and sworn confession of his friend Henry Brooke, 11th Baron Cobham. Raleigh repeatedly requested that Cobham be called to testify. "[Let] my acuser come face to face, and be deposed. Were the case but for a small copyhold, you would have witnesses or good proof to lead the jury to a verdict; and I am here for my life!" Raleigh argued that the evidence against him was "hearsay", but the tribunal refused to allow Cobham to testify and be cross-examined. Raleigh's trial has been regularly cited as influential in establishing a common law right to confront accusers in court. Raleigh was convicted, but King James spared his life.

While imprisoned in the Tower, Raleigh wrote his incomplete The Historie of the World. Using a wide array of sources in six languages, Raleigh was fully abreast of the latest continental scholarship. He wrote not about England, but of the ancient world with a heavy emphasis on geography. Despite his intention of providing current advice to the King of England, King James I complained that it was "too sawcie in censuring Princes". Raleigh remained imprisoned in the Tower until 1616. His son, Carew, was conceived and born (in 1604 or 1605) while Raleigh was imprisoned in the Tower.

Second voyage to Guiana

In 1617, Raleigh was pardoned by the King and granted permission to conduct a second expedition to Venezuela in search of El Dorado. During the expedition, a detachment of Raleigh's men under the command of his long-time friend Lawrence Kemys attacked the Spanish outpost of Santo Tomé de Guayana on the Orinoco river, in violation of peace treaties with Spain and against Raleigh's orders. A condition of Raleigh's pardon was avoidance of any hostility against Spanish colonies or shipping. In the initial attack on the settlement, Raleigh's son, Walter, was fatally shot. Kemys informed Raleigh of his son's death and begged for forgiveness, but did not receive it, and at once committed suicide. On Raleigh's return to England, an outraged Count Gondomar, the Spanish ambassador, demanded that Raleigh's death sentence be reinstated by King James, who had little choice but to do so. Raleigh was brought to London from Plymouth by Sir Lewis Stukley, where he passed up numerous opportunities to make an effective escape.

Execution and aftermath

Raleigh was beheaded in the Old Palace Yard at the Palace of Westminster on 29 October 1618. "Let us dispatch", he said to his executioner. "At this hour my ague comes upon me. I would not have my enemies think I quaked from fear." After he was allowed to see the axe that would be used to behead him, he mused: "This is a sharp Medicine, but it is a Physician for all diseases and miseries." According to biographers, Raleigh's last words, spoken to the hesitating executioner, were: "What dost thou fear? Strike, man, strike!"

Thomas Hariot may have introduced him to tobacco. Having been one of the people to popularise tobacco smoking in England, he left a small tobacco pouch, found in his cell shortly after his execution. Engraved upon the pouch was a Latin inscription: Comes meus fuit in illo miserrimo tempore ("It was my companion at that most miserable time").

Raleigh's head was embalmed and presented to his wife. His body was to be buried in the local church in Beddington, Surrey, the home of Lady Raleigh, but was finally laid to rest in St. Margaret's, Westminster, where his tomb is presently located. "The Lords", she wrote, "have given me his dead body, though they have denied me his life. God hold me in my wits." It has been said that Lady Raleigh kept her husband's head in a velvet bag until her death. After Raleigh's wife's death 29 years later, his head was removed to his tomb and interred at St. Margaret's Church. Although Raleigh's popularity had waned considerably since his Elizabethan heyday, his execution was seen by many, both at the time and since, as unnecessary and unjust, as for many years his involvement in the Main Plot seemed to have been limited to a meeting with Lord Cobham. One of the judges at his trial later said: "The justice of England has never been so degraded and injured as by the condemnation of the honourable Sir Walter Raleigh."

Works

Poetry

Raleigh's poetry is written in the relatively straightforward, unornamented mode known as the plain style. C. S. Lewis considered Raleigh one of the era's "silver poets", a group of writers who resisted the Italian Renaissance influence of dense classical reference and elaborate poetic devices. His writing contains strong personal treatments of themes such as love, loss, beauty, and time. Most of his poems are short lyrics that were inspired by actual events.

In poems such as "What is Our Life" and "The Lie", Raleigh expresses a contemptus mundi (contempt of the world) attitude more characteristic of the Middle Ages than of the dawning era of humanistic optimism. But his lesser-known long poem "The Ocean's Love to Cynthia" combines this vein with the more elaborate conceits associated with his contemporaries Edmund Spenser and John Donne, expressing a melancholy sense of history. The poem was written during his imprisonment in the Tower of London.

Raleigh wrote a poetic response to Christopher Marlowe's "The Passionate Shepherd to His Love" of 1592, entitled "The Nymph's Reply to the Shepherd". Both were written in the style of traditional pastoral poetry and follow the structure of six four-line stanzas employing a rhyme scheme of AABB, with Raleigh's an almost line-for-line refutation of Marlowe's sentiments. Years later, the 20th-century poet William Carlos Williams would join the poetic "argument" with his "Raleigh Was Right".

List of poems
All finished, and some unfinished, poems written by Raleigh or plausibly attributed to him:

 "The Advice"
 "Another of the Same"
 "Conceit begotten by the Eyes"
 "Epitaph on Sir Philip Sidney"
 "Epitaph on the Earl of Leicester"
 "Even such is Time"
 "The Excuse"
 "False Love"
 "Farewell to the Court"
 "His Petition to Queen Anne of Denmark"
 "If Cynthia be a Queen"
 "In Commendation of George Gascoigne's Steel Glass"
 "The Lie"
 "Like Hermit Poor"
 "Lines from Catullus"
 "Love and Time"
 "My Body in the Walls captive"
 "The Nymph's Reply to the Shepherd"
 "Of Spenser's Faery Queen"
 "On the Snuff of a Candle"
 "The Ocean's Love to Cynthia"
 "A Poem entreating of Sorrow"
 "A Poem put into my Lady Laiton's Pocket"
 "The Pilgrimage"
 "A Prognistication upon Cards and Dice"
 "The Shepherd's Praise of Diana"
 "Sweet Unsure"
 "To His Mistress"
 "To the Translator of Lucan's Pharsalia"
 "What is Our Life?"
 "The Wood, the Weed, the Wag"

Writing Shakespeare

In 1845, Shakespeare scholar Delia Bacon first proposed that a group of authors had actually written the plays later attributed to William Shakespeare, the main writer being Walter Raleigh. Later, George S. Caldwell asserted that Raleigh was actually the sole author. These claims have been supported by other scholars throughout subsequent years, including Albert J. Beveridge and Henry Pemberton, but are rejected by the majority of Shakespearean scholars today.

Legacy

In 2002, Raleigh was featured in the BBC poll of the 100 Greatest Britons.

A galliard was composed in honour of Raleigh by either Francis Cutting or Richard Allison.

The state capital of North Carolina, its second-largest city, was named Raleigh in 1792, after Sir Walter, sponsor of the Roanoke Colony. In the city, a bronze statue, which has been moved around different locations within the city, was cast in honour of the city's namesake. The "Lost Colony" is commemorated at the Fort Raleigh National Historic Site on Roanoke Island, North Carolina.

Raleigh County, West Virginia, is named after him.

Mount Raleigh in the Pacific Ranges of the Coast Mountains in British Columbia, Canada, was named for him, with related features the Raleigh Glacier and Raleigh Creek named in association with the mountain. Mount Gilbert, just to Mount Raleigh's south, was named for his half-brother, Sir Humphrey.

Raleigh has been widely speculated to be responsible for introducing the potato to Europe, and was a key figure in bringing it to Ireland. However, modern historians dispute this claim, suggesting it would have been impossible for Raleigh to have discovered the potato in the places he visited.

Due to Raleigh's role in the popularisation of smoking, John Lennon humorously referred to him as "such a stupid git" in the song "I'm So Tired" on the "White Album" The Beatles (1968).

Various colourful stories are told about him, such as laying his cloak over a puddle for the Queen, but they are probably apocryphal. The story of Raleigh's trial is included in John George Phillimore's 1850 book The History and Principles of Evidence, and his commentary on the story is included in many law school textbooks on evidence in common law countries.

The author George Garrett's historical fiction novel Death of the Fox explores Raleigh's relationships with Elizabeth I and her successor James I.

Raleigh's descendants

Many people claim descent from Sir Walter Raleigh, but nearly all have no basis in fact. The only authentic lines of descent are as follows:

Raleigh's only surviving child, Carew Raleigh, had three surviving children—Walter (d. 1660), Anne (d. 1708) and Philip (d. 1705).
 
The elder son, Walter Raleigh, was knighted in June 1660, but died two months later. He was buried at West Horsley. He left three surviving children—Elizabeth, Philippa and Anne. Philippa (who married Oliver Weekes, of Tortingdon, Sussex) and Anne (who married William Knight, of Barrells, Warwickshire) left descendants. It was Philippa Weekes' daughter, Elizabeth Elwes, who seems to have owned the main store of Raleigh memorabilia and was consulted by William Oldys in 1735 when he was writing his Life of Raleigh.

Anne Raleigh married Sir Peter Tyrrell, of Castlethorpe, Bucks. Her granddaughter, Harriet, married Francis Mann, of Kidlington, Oxfordshire, and died in 1785, leaving descendants.

Philip Raleigh championed his grandfather's cause, publishing several of his hitherto unpublished papers. He had a family of four sons and three daughters. The youngest son, Carew Raleigh, page of honour to William III, was serving as a captain's servant on  when he died of fever in the West Indies in 1697, aged seventeen. The second son, Lieut. Brudenell Raleigh, was also serving in the navy in the West Indies when he died of fever in June 1698, aged 22. The eldest son, Captain Walter Raleigh, Grenadier Guards, was page of honour to Queen Mary, and was killed at the siege of Schellenberg in 1704, aged 31. He was unmarried. After Walter's death, his father was granted a pension by the crown, 'in consideration of his 3 sons being slain in the late and present war'. The third son, Captain-Lieutenant Grenville Raleigh, served in the Duke of Marlborough's army throughout the War of the Spanish Succession and died of fever in 1717, while guarding the prisoners at Chester after the 1715 Jacobite rising. He had married and had two sons and a daughter, Mary. On the death of his daughter in Bath in 1783, it was noted that she was 'the only surviving descendant in the direct line of Sir Walter Raleigh'.

Of Philip Raleigh's daughters, Anne and Elizabeth both died unmarried. The eldest daughter, Frances, married William Honywood, eldest son of Sir William Honywood, of Evington Place, Elmsted, Kent and died in 1730. Her many descendants include the present Lord Mountbatten and the actor Hugh Grant.

See also
 List of colonial governors of Virginia
 Sir Walter, a race horse
 The Armada Service

References

Notes

Citations

Sources

 

 

 

 Raleigh as a writer and poet.

Further reading

 Adamson, J.H. and Folland, H. F. Shepherd of the Ocean, 1969
 Beer, Anna Sir Walter Raleigh and his readers in the Seventeenth Century (Springer, 1997).
 Beer, Anna Patriot or Traitor: The Life and Death of Sir Walter Ralegh (Oneworld, 2018)
 Hiscock, Andrew. "Walter Ralegh and the Arts of Memory." Literature Compass 4.4 (2007): 1030–1058.
 Dwyer, Jack Dorset Pioneers The History Press, 2009. 
 Gallay, Alan. Walter Ralegh: Architect of Empire (2019), a major scholarly biography  excerpt
 Holmes, John. "The Guiana Projects: Imperial and Colonial Ideologies in Ralegh and Purchas." Literature & History 14.2 (2005): 1–13.
 Lawson-Peebles, Robert. "The many faces of Sir Walter Ralegh" History Today 48.3 (1998): 17+.
 Lewis, C. S. English Literature in the Sixteenth Century Excluding Drama, (1954).
 Lyons, Mathew. The Favourite: Ralegh and His Queen (Hachette UK, 2011).
 Lyons, Mathew. "Cloaked in Mystery." History Today (2012) 62.7 pp 72–72
 Pemberton, Henry (Author); Carroll Smyth (Editor), Susan L. Pemberton (Contributor) Shakespeare And Sir Walter Raleigh: Including Also Several Essays Previously Published In The New Shakspeareana, Kessinger Publishing, LLC; 264 pages, 2007. 
 Ralegh, Sir Walter, and Michael Rudick. "The Poems of Sir Walter Ralegh: A Historical Edition." (Arizona Center for Medieval and Renaissance Studies/Renaissance English Text Society, 1999).
 Stebbing, William: Sir Walter Ralegh Oxford, 1899 Project Gutenberg eText

External links

 The Sir Walter Raleigh Collection in Wilson Library at the University of North Carolina at Chapel Hill
 Sir Walter Raleigh's Grave
 Biography of Sir Walter Raleigh at Britannia.com
 Sir Walter Raleigh at the Fort Raleigh website
 Quotes attributed to Sir Walter Raleigh
 Story of Raleigh's last years and his beheading
 Poetry by Sir Walter Raleigh, plus commentary
 Searching for the Lost Colony Blog
 Robert Viking O'Brien & Stephen Kent O'Brien, Discovery of Guiana essay, Yearbook of Comparative and General Literature
 Sir Walter Raleigh portal at luminarium.org
 
 
 
 The History of the World at Hathi Trust

 
1550s births
1618 deaths
Alumni of Oriel College, Oxford
Burials at St Margaret's, Westminster
English courtiers
English explorers of North America
English knights
English male poets
English MPs 1584–1585
English MPs 1586–1587
English MPs 1597–1598
English MPs 1601
English people of the Anglo-Spanish War (1585–1604)
English politicians convicted of crimes
English sailors
Executed people from Devon
Executed writers
Explorers of South America
Governors of Jersey
History of Guyana
Honourable Corps of Gentlemen at Arms
Knights Bachelor
Lord-Lieutenants of Cornwall
Members of the Parliament of England (pre-1707) for Cornwall
Members of the Parliament of England (pre-1707) for Devon
People executed by Stuart England by decapitation
People executed under the Stuarts for treason against England
People from East Devon District
People of Elizabethan Ireland
People of the Elizabethan era
People of the Roanoke Colony
Prisoners in the Tower of London
English army officers
Court of Elizabeth I
People of the Second Desmond Rebellion
Walter